The Liversidge Award recognizes outstanding contributions to physical chemistry. Named for the English-born chemist Archibald Liversidge, it is awarded by the Faraday Division of the Royal Society of Chemistry.

Winners
The following have won the Liversidge Award:

See also
 List of chemistry awards

References

1928 establishments in the United Kingdom
Awards of the Royal Society of Chemistry